= Japanese Air Force (disambiguation) =

Japanese Air Force may refer to:

- Japan Air Self-Defense Force (from 1954)
- Imperial Japanese Army Air Service (1912–1945)
- Imperial Japanese Navy Air Service (1912–1945)
